Tanya Sue Chutkan (born July 5, 1962) is a United States district judge of the United States District Court for the District of Columbia.

Biography

Chutkan was born on July 5, 1962, in Kingston, Jamaica. She received a Bachelor of Arts degree in 1983 from George Washington University and a Juris Doctor in 1987 from the University of Pennsylvania Law School. From 1987 to 1990, she worked at the law firm of Hogan & Hartson LLP (now Hogan Lovells). From 1990 to 1991, she worked at the law firm of Donovan, Leisure, Rogovin, Huge & Schiller. From 1991 to 2002, she was a trial attorney and supervisor at the Public Defender Service for the District of Columbia. She was a partner at the law firm of Boies, Schiller & Flexner, where her practice focused on complex civil litigation and specifically antitrust class action cases.

Her husband, Peter Krauthamer, has been a judge on the Superior Court of the District of Columbia, since April 20, 2012. They have two sons.

Federal judicial service
On December 19, 2013, President Barack Obama nominated Chutkan as a judge of the United States District Court for the District of Columbia, a seat created pursuant to 104 Stat. 5089. She received a hearing before the United States Senate Judiciary Committee on February 25, 2014. On March 27, 2014, her nomination was reported out of committee by a voice vote.  On June 3, 2014, the United States Senate invoked cloture on her nomination by a 54–40 vote. On June 4, 2014, her nomination was confirmed by a 95–0 vote. She received her judicial commission on June 5, 2014.

Notable cases
In February 2017, Public.Resource.Org was sued by the American Society for Testing and Materials, the National Fire Protection Association, the American Society of Heating, Refrigerating and Air Conditioning Engineers, and other entities for scanning and making available building codes and fire codes which these organizations consider their copyrighted property. Chutkan ruled against Public.Resource.Org, ordering all of the standards to be deleted from the Internet.

In summer 2017 Chutkan presided over the Imran Awan and Hina Alvi fraud case.

In Garza v. Hargan (2017), Chutkan ordered the Office of Refugee Resettlement to allow a girl in its care to have an abortion.  That ruling was vacated by a panel of the United States Court of Appeals for the District of Columbia Circuit, reinstated by the full en banc D.C. Circuit, and ultimately mooted by the U.S. Supreme Court. In December 2017, Chutkan granted relief to two additional pregnant minors who sued seeking access to abortion services while in ORR custody. In March 2018, Chutkan certified a class action and ordered ORR to provide access to abortions to all minors in their custody.

On June 8, 2018, Chutkan blocked until June 20 the release in Syrian Democratic Forces-controlled territory of a dual-nationality Saudi-American citizen alleged to have joined ISIL. The man, who is now held for nine months in Iraq, was planned to be released by the U.S. military – with a new cell phone, some food and water and $4,210 in cash, and his Professional Association of Diving Instructors (PADI) identification card, as soon as the next day.

On March 7, 2019, Chutkan ruled that U.S. Secretary of Education Betsy DeVos illegally delayed the implementation of the "Equity in IDEA" regulations. These regulations updated how states calculate racial disparities in the identification of children as being eligible for special education, the placement of children in restrictive classroom settings, and the use exclusionary discipline. Chutkan also ruled that the U.S. Department of Education violated the law concerning the spread of regulations by neglecting to provide a "reasoned explanation" for the delay, and failing to account for the costs that child, parents, and society would bear.

On April 26, 2019, Chutkan sentenced Maria Butina to 18 months in prison for conspiring to be an unregistered agent of the Russian government in the United States.

On November 20, 2019, Chutkan issued a preliminary injunction against the U.S. Department of Justice, finding that federal inmates sentenced to death were likely to succeed in arguing that the federal government's new lethal injection procedure—which uses a single drug, pentobarbital, rather than the three-drug combination previously in place--“exceeds statutory authority" under the Federal Death Penalty Act. Chutkan's order was later reversed by a divided panel of the U.S. Court of Appeals for the D.C. Circuit, and the case is currently pending before the U.S. Supreme Court. The reversal of the injunction was upheld and thirteen federal inmates were executed.

On November 9, 2021, Chutkan denied former President Donald Trump's plea to keep records from being released to the House Select Committee investigating the attack on the Capitol on January 6, 2021. The D.C. Circuit affirmed that decision, and the U.S. Supreme Court declined review.

See also 
 List of African-American federal judges
 List of African-American jurists
 List of Jamaican Americans

References

External links

1962 births
21st-century American judges
21st-century American women judges
African-American judges
American women lawyers
Boies Schiller Flexner people
George Washington University alumni
Judges of the United States District Court for the District of Columbia
Lawyers from Washington, D.C.
Living people
People associated with Hogan Lovells
People from Kingston, Jamaica
Public defenders
United States district court judges appointed by Barack Obama
University of Pennsylvania Law School alumni